Marian Rose (1933-1970) was an international speedway rider from Poland.

Speedway career 
Rose won a gold medal in the Speedway World Team Cup in the 1966 Speedway World Team Cup. He was killed in a race at the Stal Rzeszów Speedway Circuit on 19 April 1970, following a combination of hitting his head when falling off his bike and another rider crashing into him at the same time. The MotoArena Toruń in Poland is named after him.

World final appearances

Individual World Championship
 1965 -  London, Wembley Stadium - Reserve - Did not ride

World Team Cup
 1964 -  Abensberg, Abensberg Stadion (with Andrzej Wyglenda / Andrzej Pogorzelski / Zbigniew Podlecki / Marian Kaiser) - 4th - 16pts (2)
 1966 -  Wrocław, Olympic Stadium (with Andrzej Pogorzelski / Andrzej Wyglenda / Antoni Woryna / Edmund Migoś) - Winner - 41pts (10)

See also
Rider deaths in motorcycle racing

References 

1933 births
1970 deaths
Polish speedway riders
Sportspeople from Toruń